In the summer of 2002, coach Marius Lăcătuş refused to extend his contract saying that he is unhappy with the current financial situation at Oțelul and left the team. Soon after, many players whose contracts were expiring also left the team. They were joined by vice-president Mihai Stoica, who signed for Steaua. President Ion Ionică appointed Costel Orac as the new manager. Later in that summer, Igor Pîrvu is named as the new president of the club.

Competitions

Friendlies

Divizia A

Although at the end of the season they had to compete in a playout match in order to remain in Divizia A, which they lost, Oțelul still managed to keep their place in the first league due to the merger of Divizia A team Astra Ploieşti and the newly promoted Petrolul Ploieşti, which resulted in the creation of FC Petrolul Ploieşti, thus freeing a spot.

League table

Results by round

Results summary

Matches

Cupa României

Players

Squad statistics

Transfers

In

Out

References

External links
 The Rec.Sport.Soccer Statistics Foundation at rsssf.com
 Divizia A at romaniansoccer.ro

ASC Oțelul Galați seasons
Oțelul Galați, FC